Sushkov is a Russian masculine surname, its feminine counterpart is Sushkova. It may refer to
Mikhail Sushkov (1775–1792), Russian nobleman and writer 
Mikhail Sushkov (footballer) (1899–1983), Russian football player
Oleg Sushkov, Russian physicist 

Russian-language surnames